Oxilofrine (also known as methylsynephrine, hydroxyephrine, oxyephrine, and 4-HMP) is a stimulant drug and is an amphetamine chemically related to ephedrine and to synephrine.

Oxilofrine is currently a World Anti-Doping Agency (WADA) prohibited substance when used in competition. It has been found as an adulterant in some dietary supplements. Even after receiving warning letters from the FDA, some sports and weight loss supplement companies continue to use oxilofrine as an undeclared ingredient in their products despite it being prohibited.

History 

Oxilofrine was originally developed in the 1930s as a cardiac stimulant. Trade names included Suprifen (Bayer) and, combined with an adenosine-containing standardized organ extract, Carnigen (Hoechst AG).

In combination with normethadone, it was marketed as a cough suppressant under the trade name Ticarda. As of 2021, this formulation was still manufactured in Canada by Valeant and sold as Cophylac.

Several other stimulants and vasodilators were developed as chemical derivatives of oxilofrine, such as buphenine.

Society and culture 
Several doping cases involving oxilofrine have been publicized, including:
In 2009, Brazilian/American cyclist Flávia Oliveira was suspended for 2 years after taking a supplement known as "HyperDrive 3.0+" which contained methylsynephrine, a chemical equivalent of oxilofrine, among other substances. Her sentence was eventually reduced to 18 months after an appeal as there was enough evidence that she had unknowingly consumed said substance as the old label did not list methylsynephrine.
 On 18 September 2010, Vietnamese weightlifter Hoàng Anh Tuấn, silver medalist in 2008 Summer Olympics was handed a four year ban, later reduced to two years, for testing positive with the substance. It was found out that the substance came from unlabeled drinks he consumed during his training in China.
 On July 14, 2013, Jamaican runners Asafa Powell and Sherone Simpson tested positive for oxilofrine prior to the 2013 World Athletics Championships. Powell, however, maintained that he did not take any banned supplements knowingly or willfully. Powell voluntarily withdrew as a result of the test. On 10 April 2014, both athletes received an 18-month suspension from competing, which was set to expire in December that year. However, after appealing to the Court of Arbitration for Sport (CAS), both athletes' suspensions were lifted on 14 July 2014.
 On July 16, 2015, Red Sox pitching prospect Michael Kopech was suspended without pay for 50 games after testing positive for oxilofrine, which is a banned substance under the Minor League Drug Prevention and Treatment Program. Kopech denied knowingly taking the substance.
 In October 2018, the WBO stripped boxer Billy Joe Saunders of its middleweight world title after he tested positive for oxilofrine, as a result of a drug test administered by the Voluntary Anti-Doping Association. In his defense, Saunders held that while the substance was proscribed by VADA it was not banned "out of competition" by UK Anti-Doping, or the British Boxing Board of Control, but this appeal was rejected.

References 

Norepinephrine releasing agents
Phenylethanolamines
Substituted amphetamines